The Honda Valkyrie is a motorcycle that was manufactured by Honda from 1997 to 2003. It was designated GL1500C in the US market and F6C ("Flat Six Custom") in other markets.

The Valkyrie engine is a  liquid-cooled, horizontally opposed flat-six engine shared with Honda's Gold Wing model, unlike the V-twin engine commonly found on "cruiser" style motorcycles. In its transplant from the Goldwing, the most notable engine changes were the camshaft and the change to six individual 28 mm carburetors, one for each cylinder, changes which increased power and torque.

The Valkyrie was offered with a reverse gear in Japan. The Valkyrie was made in the United States at the Honda motorcycle plant in Marysville, Ohio.

Other models

Standard, Tourer and Interstate

On introduction in 1997, a naked Standard and later, a Tourer model were offered.  The Tourer included a windshield and lockable hard saddlebags. It was designated as a GL1500CT

In 1999, the Interstate model was added to the lineup, which included a fork-mounted fairing along with a larger capacity fuel tank and a trunk at the rear of the motorcycle. It was designated as a GL1500CJ.

As sales eventually dwindled, the Interstate and Tourer models were dropped after 2001, leaving only the Standard model remaining.  2003 saw the Standard offered only in black and was the last year of the original Valkyrie.

Rune

Honda introduced a limited edition model in 2003 named the Valkyrie Rune with a  engine.  It was a major departure from the original Valkyrie in styling and purpose.

This model was produced at the Honda motorcycle plant in Marysville, Ohio.

EVO6 concept

Honda presented the EVO6 concept motorcycle at the Tokyo Motor Show 2007. Based on the flat-six  engine from the Goldwing, the EVO6 produces more power than its touring ancestor. The EVO6 features Honda's Human Friendly Transmission (HFT) that can be operated in a fully automatic mode or a six-speed manual mode.

Reintroduction
The Valkyrie was reintroduced in November 2013 (as a 2014 model) as a redesign of the GL1800 Gold Wing.

The reintroduced Valkyrie (F6C) shared the same liquid cooled 1832cc flat six engine (117 bhp at 5,500 rpm/123 lb.-ft. torque at 4,000 rpm) as well as underlying frame and 5-speed transmission as the Honda Goldwing.  However the Valkyrie loses the fairing, windshield and bags (windshield and bags are available Honda optional accessories).  ABS is also available (not standard).  The Valkyrie has an all digital multi-instrument dash screen.

At the Tokyo Motor Show, Honda revealed their new 'naked' version of the GL1800, as the 2014 Valkyrie, using the same 1832cc six-cylinder engine as the Gold Wing but weighing  less. The new Valkyrie has increased rake and trail, front and rear suspension revised for the reduced weight, 50/50 weight distribution and large tires after the fashion of sport-bikes. The Valkyrie's horsepower-to-weight ratio puts it in the muscle bike class according to some reviewers. It was expected to be on sale by Spring, 2014, for about $17,000 for the base model (the model with an anti-lock braking system will cost more). The reintroduced Valkyrie was only available for two model years (2014 and 2015) before Honda dropped the bike in the US market.

References

External links

 Motorcycle Test: Honda Valkyrie 1500 F6 at MotorcycleCruiser.com

Valkyrie
Cruiser motorcycles
Motorcycles introduced in 1997
Six-cylinder motorcycles
Motorcycles powered by flat engines
Shaft drive motorcycles